{{DISPLAYTITLE:C20H18O4}}
The molecular formula C20H18O4 may refer to:

 Glabrene, an isoflavonoid that is found in Glycyrrhiza glabra (licorice)
 Phaseolin (pterocarpan), a prenylated pterocarpan found in French bean (Phaseolus vulgaris) seeds and in the stems of Erythrina subumbrans